XVIII Dicembre is a Turin Metro station, located under Piazza XVIII Dicembre, near Porta Susa railway station. The station was opened on 4 February 2006 as the eastern terminus of the inaugural section of Turin Metro, between Fermi and XVIII Dicembre. It ceased to be terminal on 5 October 2007, when a new section of the Metro (to Porta Nuova) was opened.

The platforms feature decals by Ugo Nespolo, depicting the 1922 Turin massacre.

Services
 Ticket vending machines
 Handicap accessibility
 Elevators
 Escalators
 Active CCTV surveillance

References

Turin Metro stations
Railway stations opened in 2006
2006 establishments in Italy
Railway stations in Italy opened in the 21st century